Patos Island Lighthouse is an active aid to navigation overlooking the Strait of Georgia at Alden Point on the western tip of Patos Island in the San Juan Islands, San Juan County, Washington, in the United States. The station is the northernmost in the San Juan Islands and marks the
division point between the eastern and western passages into the Strait of Juan de Fuca.

In 2013, Patos Island and its lighthouse were included in the US Presidential Proclamation by Barack Obama creating San Juan Islands National Monument, managed by the Bureau of Land Management, part of the US Department of Interior.  Limited developments on the island are managed in partnership with Washington State Parks and volunteers with the nonprofit friends group Keeper of the Patos Light.  On some maps it is also referred to as Patos Island State Park.

Access to Patos Island is challenging; no public ferry system serves the 200 acre island. Two offshore  mooring buoys are available for private boats as permitted through the Washington State Parks.  Volunteer opportunities, however, offer regular summer access through the Keepers of the Patos Light.

Through a Washington State Lighthouse Environmental Program (LEP) grant, the Keeper of the Patos Light are developing exhibits for the lighthouse.

History
The original light station was a post light and third-class Daboll trumpet fog signal. Beginning operation on November 30, 1893, the light was used as a navigational aid to steamships traveling to ports around Georgia Strait such as Vancouver, and up the Inside Passage to Alaska.

The lighthouse was improved in 1908 with a new fog signal and a  tower, which housed a fourth-order Fresnel lens. The light was automated in 1974. Today, it has a modern lens which flashes a white light once every six seconds and has two red sectors marking dangerous shoals off the island. The original fourth-order Fresnel lens is now in private ownership in Oregon.

The early years of the light were recorded in The Light on the Island, the childhood recollections of Helene Glidden, daughter of Edward Durgan who was lighthouse keeper from 1905-1913.

Patos Island Lighthouse was listed on the U.S. National Register of Historic Places in 1977. Through federal funding from the U.S. Bureau of Land Management, the lighthouse was renovated in 2008 with a new roof, doors, windows, gutters and downspouts, and new paint inside and out. The lighthouse is the last remaining structure at this site, but similar 1893 structures can be viewed at Turn Point Lighthouse, located on Stuart Island and also part of San Juan Islands National Monument.

References

External links

Keepers of the Patos Light
Patos Islands  Bureau of Land Management 
Patos Island State Park Washington State Parks and Recreation Commission

Lighthouses completed in 1893
Greek Revival architecture in Washington (state)
Lighthouses on the National Register of Historic Places in Washington (state)
Transportation buildings and structures in San Juan County, Washington
National Register of Historic Places in San Juan County, Washington